R.I.P.D. The Game is a co-op third-person shooter video game based on the 2013 film R.I.P.D.. It was developed by Old School Games and published by Atlus USA. It was released on July 17, 2013 for the Xbox 360, PlayStation 3 and Microsoft Windows. The gameplay is derived from Old School Games' previous game, God Mode. Players in R.I.P.D. The Game are able to play as Roy Pulsipher or Nick Walker in a cooperative horde mode gametype against renegade ghosts also known as "deadoes", who stay on earth to avoid their fate in the afterlife.

Plot 
R.I.P.D. The Game summarizes the events of the movie, covering Nick Walker's death, to his arrival at the afterlife law enforcement agency, the R.I.P.D. The stylized comic also introduces Nick Walker's partner, Roy Pulsipher, a nineteenth-century law enforcer who also works for the R.I.P.D. The introductory comic also informs the player of motives of the monsters, referred to as "deadoes", and depicts them stealing gold artifacts but leaves their ulterior motives a mystery. However, this is the only cutscene, and the game immediately drops the player in a tutorial afterwards.

Gameplay 
R.I.P.D. The Game is a third-person shooter that has players gunning down monsters called "deadoes", in a horde mode with one other player cooperatively across online matchmaking. There are seven maps for each of the seven missions and a final boss at the end of each one. Matches are composed of five rounds with each round increasing in difficulty compared to the last. Players are able to buy and upgrade weapons using in game currency. These weapons include a standard arsenal of shotguns, assault rifles, and references to the movie such as a banana or a hairdryer. Enemies can be defeated through in game firearms or by standing next to marked enemies in order to arrest them. At the end of each level, bounties are collected from surviving all five waves of enemies. The game also provides challenges for the player to complete to earn more points at the end of a match. One of the game's unique features is betting, which allows the player to bet in game currency on who will get the most points at the end of a match. The player's main way of interacting with the world is through shooting or grenades to defeat enemies, however some enemies may be marked for arrest which is done by standing near the marked enemy for the specified time limit. At the end of each round, players may buy new weapons or upgrades for existing ones. Achievements can be earned through in-game actions, which include references to the movie.

Reception 

R.I.P.D. The Game received negative reviews. The game holds an average of 39% and 42% on aggregate websites Metacritic and GameRankings. The majority of complaints about R.I.P.D. The Game are its lack of story, repetitive mechanics, and its similarity to Old School Game's previous entry, God Mode.

References 

2013 video games
Atlus games
PlayStation 3 games
PlayStation Network games
Saber Interactive games
Xbox 360 games
Xbox 360 Live Arcade games
Windows games
Video games about police officers
Video games based on films
Video games based on adaptations
Video games based on Dark Horse Comics films
Video games developed in the United States
Video games set in Boston
Third-person shooters